Prospect House or Prospect Hall or variations may refer to:

in the United States (by state then town)
Prospect Terrace Apartments, Little Rock, Arkansas, listed on the National Register of Historic Places (NRHP)
Prospect Farm, Petersburg, Kentucky, NRHP-listed
Prospect Hall (Frederick, Maryland), NRHP-listed 
Pleasant Prospect, Mitchellville, Maryland, NRHP-listed 
Prospect Hall (Cambridge, Massachusetts), also known as North Avenue Congregational Church, NRHP-listed
Prospect House (Hadley, Massachusetts), a hotel established in 1851, now the Summit House in J. A. Skinner State Park
Prospect House (Waltham, Massachusetts), NRHP-listed
Prospect House (Battle Lake, Minnesota), NRHP-listed in Otter Tail County
Prospect House (Princeton, New Jersey), Princeton, New Jersey, also known simply as Prospect, a National Historic Landmark and NRHP-listed
Prospect Hall (Brooklyn, New York), NRHP-listed
Prospect House (Hamilton County, New York), first hotel in the world with electric lights in all the guest rooms
Piney Prospect, Tarboro, North Carolina, NRHP-listed
Prospect Place, Trinway, Ohio, NRHP-listed
Prospect Hotel, Prospect, Oregon, NRHP-listed
Prospect (Topping, Virginia), a house that is NRHP-listed
Prospect House (Washington, D.C.), NRHP-listed

in the United Kingdom (by location)
Prospect House (Reading), an 18th century house in Reading, now used as restaurant

See also
 Prospect (disambiguation)
 Prospect Hill (disambiguation)
 Prospect Hill Historic District (disambiguation)